Chennai Egmore–Mangalore Central Express is an express train connecting Chennai in Tamil Nadu, India with Mangalore in Karnataka, India. The main cities it passes through are Chennai Egmore, Villuppuram, Tiruchirappalli, Karur, Erode, Coimbatore, Palakkad, Tirur (Malappuram), Kozhikode, Kannur, Kasargod and Mangalore

Overview 

This train was introduced during the 2003–2004 Railway Budget as a new daily train between Chennai Egmore and Erode via Tiruchirappalli Junction in Tamil Nadu, India. Later in the 2005–2006 Railway Budget, the train (No.66076608) was extended up to Coimbatore, citing large number of Melmaruvathur bound pilgrims, leaving the people of Karur in despair, who were largely benefitted of this train fearing decrease in reservation quotas. The train was again extended to Mangalore in 2007, a move which forced the authorities to cancel the Tiruchirapalli–Mangalore Express (No.68676868), with revised timings. The number of train was changed from the initial 66076608 to 61076108, and from 61076108 to 1610716108 since December 2010 onwards as a part of train management system over the entire Indian Railways network. Again, the number of the train was changed to 16159 16160

Rakes 
The train has 23 coaches comprising One AC First Cum AC 2-Tier (HA1), Three AC 3-Tier (3A), Eleven Second Class Sleepers, Two Second Seating (2S), Four General compartments (Unreserved) and Two Luggage rakes.

Schedule

Accident
On 04 September 2015, 5 coaches including 3 AC coaches and an Unreserved coach along with SLR of  16859 DOWN Chennai Egmore - Mangalore Express derailed near Puvanur railway station, Villupuram - Vridhachalam section of Chord line. 39 passengers were reported injured.

See also 
 Mangalore Mail
 Mangala Lakshadweep Express

Notes

References

External links 
 Southern Railway - Official Website

Express trains in India
Rail transport in Tamil Nadu
Railway services introduced in 2003
Rail transport in Kerala
Rail transport in Karnataka